Texas's 2nd congressional district of the United States House of Representatives is in the southeastern portion of the state of Texas. It encompasses parts of northern and eastern Harris County and southern Montgomery County, Texas.

From 2002 to 2012, it stretched from Houston's northern suburbs through eastern Harris County, and across Southeast Texas to the Louisiana border. As of the 2000 census, the 2nd district represented 651,619 people.  The district's configuration dates from the 2003 Texas redistricting, when most of the old 9th district was split among three neighboring districts. The four-term Democratic incumbent in the 9th district, Nick Lampson, was unseated by Republican Ted Poe, a longtime felony-court judge in Harris County. In November 2017, Poe announced that he would retire from Congress at the end of his current term, and did not seek re-election in 2018. Dan Crenshaw was elected on November 6, 2018 and is currently serving as congressman.

2012 redistricting
The 2012 redistricting process radically changed the district. Beaumont, which had been part of the 2nd and its predecessors for over a century, was removed along with all of Jefferson County.  All of Liberty County was removed as well, putting the district entirely within Harris County. The district now includes Kingwood, Humble, and Atascocita in northeastern Harris County, then loops around northern and western Houston before moving toward the center of the city roughly following Interstate 10. The district then passes through Memorial Park before turning south and capturing the strongly Democratic Montrose, Rice University, and parts of Braeswood.

Recent election results from statewide races

List of members representing the district 
The district was formed December 29, 1845, after Texas joined the Union.

Election results

2004

2006

2010

2012

2014

2016

2018

2020

2022

See also
 List of United States congressional districts

References

 
 
 Congressional Biographical Directory of the United States 1774–present

02
Jefferson County, Texas
Liberty County, Texas
Harris County, Texas
Orange County, Texas